Tony Price may refer to:
Tony Price (artist) (1937–2000)
Tony Price (basketball) (born 1957), former NBA player

See also
Tony Curzon Price (born 1967)
Toni Price, singer
Anthony Price (disambiguation)